Michel Pottier (born 12 January 1948) is a French former footballer. He competed in the men's tournament at the 1976 Summer Olympics.

References

External links
 

1948 births
Living people
French footballers
Olympic footballers of France
Footballers at the 1976 Summer Olympics
Place of birth missing (living people)
Association football defenders
Mediterranean Games silver medalists for France
Mediterranean Games medalists in football
Competitors at the 1975 Mediterranean Games
SC Douai players
AC Cambrai players
Tours FC players